Abdullah Al-Sooli (born 20 January 1988) is an Omani sprinter who specializes in the 100 metres. He was born in Al-Rustaq.

He competed at the 2006 World Junior Championships and the 2008 Olympic Games without progressing to the second round. His personal best time is 10.53 seconds, achieved in the 2008 Olympic heat in Beijing.

References

External links
 
 
 

1988 births
Living people
Omani male sprinters
Athletes (track and field) at the 2008 Summer Olympics
Olympic athletes of Oman
Athletes (track and field) at the 2010 Asian Games
Asian Games competitors for Oman
People from Al-Rustaq